Group D of the 1996 Fed Cup Europe/Africa Zone Group II was one of four pools in the Europe/Africa zone of the 1996 Fed Cup. Four teams competed in a round robin competition, with the top two teams advancing to the play-offs.

Denmark vs. Ireland

Malta vs. Iceland

Ukraine vs. Ireland

Denmark vs. Malta

Ukraine vs. Denmark

Ireland vs. Iceland

Ukraine vs. Iceland

Ireland vs. Malta

Ukraine vs. Malta

Denmark vs. Iceland

See also
Fed Cup structure

References

External links
 Fed Cup website

1996 Fed Cup Europe/Africa Zone